Oriyan Thoonda Oriyagapuji is an Indian Tulu-language comedy film directed by H.S. Rajshekhar starring Arjun Kapikad, Prajwal Pooviah in the lead roles and Bhojaraj Vamanjoor, Aravind Bolar, Rekhadas, Mitra, Chethan Rai, Sunder Rai, Saikrishna in supporting roles. Oriyan Thoonda Oriyagapuji is produced by Gangadhar Shetty and Ashok Kumar under the banner of Sri Mangala Ganesh Combines. The movie was released on 15 May 2015.

Cast
Arjun Kapikad
 Prajwal Pooviah 
Bhojaraj Vamanjoor
Aravind Bolar
 Rekhadas
 Mitra
 Chethan Rai
Sunder Rai
 Saikrishna

Soundtrack
The soundtracks of the film were composed by V.Manohar

List of Tulu Movies
List of tulu films of 2015
List of Tulu films of 2014
List of Released Tulu films
Tulu cinema

References

External links 
 

2015 films